Stefanie Dijkhuizen is a Dutch football midfielder currently playing in 4th-tier First Division for RKDEO. She previously played in the former Hoofdklasse for Ter Leede, with whom she also played the European Cup.

She was a member of the Dutch national team.

References

1983 births
Living people
Dutch women's footballers
Netherlands women's international footballers
Footballers from The Hague
Women's association football midfielders
Ter Leede players